= Charles Blackman (priest) =

Charles Blackman (c. 1798 – 16 March 1853) was a Church of England priest and school administrator in St John's, Newfoundland.
